was a village located in Tone District, northeastern Gunma Prefecture.

Geography 
River：Tone River, Katashina River, 入沢川, 大久保川

History 
April 1, 1889 - Due to the municipal status enforcement, the villages of Kawahake(川額), Tochikubo(栃久保), and Morishita(森下) merged to form the village of Kuroho, Kitaseta District.
April 1, 1896 - Due to the district mergers(merger between Kitaseta and Tone Districts), the village belongs to Tone District.
November 1, 1958 - Merged with the village of Itonose, Tone District, to become the village of Showa, Tone District.

Kuroho